Borce Gjurev (born 2 August 1969) is a Macedonian-born Cypriot retired footballer who played at both professional and international levels as a midfielder.

International career
He made his senior debut for Cyprus in an October 2000 FIFA World Cup qualification match against the Netherlands and has earned a total of 3 caps, scoring no goals. His final international was a May 2002 friendly match away against Greece.

References

External links

 German career stats - FuPa

1969 births
Living people
Cypriot people of Macedonian descent
Association football midfielders
Yugoslav footballers
Macedonian footballers
Cypriot footballers
Cyprus international footballers
FC 08 Homburg players
K.R.C. Genk players
Ethnikos Achna FC players
2. Bundesliga players
Bundesliga players
Belgian Pro League players
Cypriot First Division players
Yugoslav expatriate footballers
Expatriate footballers in Germany
Yugoslav expatriate sportspeople in Germany
Macedonian expatriate footballers
Expatriate footballers in Belgium
Macedonian expatriate sportspeople in Belgium
Cypriot football managers
Ethnikos Achna FC managers